Kottur-Malayandipattinam or Kottur is the biggest panchayat town in Anaimalai_taluk of Coimbatore rural district in the Indian state of Tamil Nadu. Its short name is KM Pattinam. The name Kottur-Malayandipattinam is used to distinguish it from other places of the same name in south India, with Malayandipattinam (malai-yandi-pattanam) being the name of the southern part of the town and named after being surrounded by western ghats (Indira Gandhi wildlife santuay and national park). It is famous for buying elephant ivory 100 years before, kottur Tamil meaning of kottu is elephant ivory and it also means the end of town.

Geography
Kottur-Malayandipattinam is located 15 km west of Pollachi in the Coimbatore district, and is the biggest panchayat town in Anaimalai_taluk. Its latitude is 10.5344 and Longitude is 76.9774. The Anaimalai and Valparai Hills of Western Ghats and Aliyar Reservoir are just 5 km away. The River Aliyar runs near Malayandipattinam.

It is near Anaimalai and Vettaikaranpudur, and places of tourist interest including Aliyar Dam, Monkey Falls, the village of Navamalai, and the Indira Gandhi Wildlife Sanctuary.

Etymology
Kottur-Malayandipattinam is an urban name of two villages, namely Kottur and Malayandipattinam, which grew together during the British Colonial period to form the biggest Town Panchayat of AnamalaiTaluka of Coimbatore District. The word Kottur means in Tamil a village at the end and the word Malayandipattinam means a town near the mountains. The Navamalai, Valparai and Anaimalai Hills are just 5 km from the borders of Kottur-Malayandipattinam.

Demographics
 India census, Kottur had a population of 25,261. Males constitute about 50% of the population (12,616) and females a little above 50% (12,645). For every 1000 men, there are 1002 women. Kottur has an average literacy rate of 63%, higher than the national average of 59.5%: male literacy is 71%, and female literacy is 56%. In Kottur, 10% of the population is under 6 years of age.

Transport
Kottur-Malayandipattinam is linked by road with all the cities via Pollachi, Valparai, Palakkad, Udumalaipettai and Palani. The local bus numbers from Pollachi to K.M Pattinam are 2, 9, 9A, 9B, 9C, 10, 10a, 10b, 17, 29, 29 a/c, 29B, 29C, 37, 37a, 37a/b, murugan9b, RNS, and 37B, 57a. Buses to Navamalai, Kadamparai and certain buses going to Valparai hill counties go via KM Pattinam, bus from Udumalpet & Palani to Annamalai will also crosses through KM Pattinum All the villages and small towns near Kottur-Malayandipattinam are well connected by proper roads and bus services run by the Coimbatore branch of State Transport Corporation of Tamil Nadu (TNSTC).
The nearest airport is at Coimbatore, about 54 km. From airport prepaid taxis are available. You can choose a car of your choice and pay. Normal prepaid charge from airport to Kottur-Malayandipattinam is Rs.1000/. The nearest railway station is at Pollachi, about 14 km. As the conversion of tracks from meter gauge to broad gauge is going on since three years. There is a computer reservation system at the Pollachi Railway station which is becoming very active. For Tatkal reservation which normally starts at 8:00 a.m. Coimbatore Railway station is about 57 km away. All connections are available.

Population
Kottur-Malayandipattinam is peaceful and different communities live harmoniously.

 India census, Kottur had a population of 24,999. Males constitute 50% of the population and females 50%. Literacy rates average 63%, higher than the national average of 59.5%: male literacy is 71%, and female literacy is 56%. In Kottur, 10% of the population is under 6 years of age. Now population of kottur is above 35000

Many tribal people speak their own dialects, which are closely connected with south Indian languages, and there are a few Malayalis in the town.

Religion
The northern part of Kottur is home to a large population of Hindus &Muslims, with the population of the southern part of Malayandipattinam being mainly Hindu; a small number of Christians also live in Kottur-Malayandipattinam.

Hindu temples in the area include the Mahaliamman, Kamatchi Amman, OM Sakthi, Adaliamman, Karupparayan and Kannimar temples in nearby Navamalai.

Muslims are served by the Sunnath Zamath mosque and the Rabbania Arabi madrasah.

A modern small Christian church exists on the outskirts of Kottur.

Infrastructure 
After Pollachi Town, Kottur-Malayandipattinam is an important commercial centre for many of the neighbouring villages and Hill people. It is also well cultivated agriculturally, thanks to the Aliyar-Paramikulam multiproject scheme done by the Congress Government under the rule of Mr. K. Kamaraj in the sixties. It has 3 secondary schools, one for boys, one for girls and the other co-educational. There are many primary and middle schools. There is also one Madrasa for Muslims in Kottur area. A Christian school run by TELC is located in the busy market street of Malayandipattinam.
There is one big Government Hospital and there are many private clinics for primary health care. There is however only one hospital with a bit of modern health care, namely Kalaivani Hospital. One has to go to Coimbatore for multi specialty hospital which is 58 km away.

The Police station of Kottur-Malayandipattinam has jurisdiction over many neighbouring villages covering almost 13 km in north, south and east.

There is only two nationalized bank in Kottur-Malayandipattinam, namely the Indian Overseas Bank (IOB) and corporation bank. There is one LD bank in Kottur-Malayandipattinam, namely the Anaimalai Cooperative Primary Agriculture and Rural Development Bank ltd. There is a Tamil Nadu Mercantile bank and there are branches of other small cooperative banks which cater to very few. Private Money lenders operate successfully exploiting the rural and poor people. There are many shops give loans against gold and jewellery.

Kottur-Malayandipattinam has proper bus-stand and has many bus-stops. The buses stop at different points. There are many taxis near the stand near the Police station. They charge arbitrary fees and charges. There is no meter. A limited range of auto-rickshaws are available.

There are so many small restaurants which give south Indian meals. There is one big hotel along with the boarding facility named VIKRAM hotel.

There is a weekly market for vegetables and grains, on Wednesdays. There are many shops on the main road connecting Kottur and Malayandipattinam which stock things needed for the population. There are two supermarkets. Liquor shops run by the Government of Tamil Nadu [TASMAC] offer Indian made foreign liquors (IMFL) like beer, whisky. These shops do good business. Their customers disturb the smooth flow of the traffic on the main market road. The traditional palm-wine and local arrack are available illegally. They are forbidden in Tamil Nadu.

For many skilled works, there is a shortage of persons. There is a heavy demand for electricians, welders, plumbers, masons and other workers.

Many coir factories run around the town panjayat. The most of the employment was created by coir industries. Coir products were exported directly to China, Europe, United States and Middle East countries.

Temples
KM Pattinam has many temples, one church and one mosque. The famous temples are Mahaliamman Temple, Kamakshiamman Temple, Bala Murugan Temple and Black Mariamman Temple. There are two Mahaliamman temples, one in Kottur and the other is in Malayandipattinam run by the public, as tax is collected from everyone for the temples once or twice in a year. It is an unwritten law that the yearly temple festival of Kottur Mahaliamman Kovil is celebrated first and then a week later in Malayandipattinam.The black Mariamman Temple, which the Sri Lankan Tamils made popular, is taken care of them. All temples in KM Pattinam are managed by the communities. They are not taken over by the Government. 
A big mosque is there in Kottur for the Muslims who live around the area.
Christians have built a small church at the outskirts of Kottur recently.

Festivals
The main festivals of the town were mahaliamman temple yearly festivals the run of temple car leads the function.

Tourist spots

The famous tourist spots near Kottur-Malayandipattinam are Aliyar Dam (5 km), Monkey Falls (7 km), Navamalai (13 km), Indira Gandhi Wildlife Sanctuary (6 km), and Aatthu parai anai kattu (4 km) and known as MYLADU DURAI, the famous cini location.. The famous temples are Mahaliamman Temples, Adhaliamman Temple near Monkey Falls on the Navamalai Road, Karupparayan and Kannimar Temples in Navamalai at the river bank of Aliyar in the forests. Aliyar-Parambikulam contour canal running through the mountains is worth to watch for the engineering skills. Another beautiful trek is the way to Thadaganatchi hills, an artistic temple is being built in the foot hill for the deity samukthiambigal.  Valparai Hills (40 km) are now developed as tourist centres on the pattern of Ootty and Kodaikanal Hills. However the tea estate owners, it is told, were resisting the development.
Parai bagavathi amman temple, a famous temple located in this area, also attracts many visitors.
There are many male visitors who have the habit of drinking alcohol for the sake "kick" and they through bottles and plastics everywhere. They stare at girls and ladies, make comments. Don't get provoked. Just ignore them. It is the best way for your safety.
There are two ashram like units near aliyar foothills. One belongs to the Vethathiri Maharishi's Temple of Consciousness and the other to the Maithreyi centre. Many people visit these two places for natural cure and meditation.
Another important place is Aathmanathavanam where samukthiyambikai and kalasamhara bairavar temples are situated in the foothills of thadaikai malai. This is an enchanting place for spiritual travellers.

Anjaneyar temple (5 km) River temple n.m.sungam next bus stop all weekly open the temple

Filmy connection

The surroundings of KM Pattinam are very beautiful. Paddy fields and coconut grooves cover vast stretches of land. Aatthu parai anai kattu and other scenery form the backdrop of many south Indian and Bollywood films. Earlier shooting was free of charge, but today the land/ site owners and the local administration charge heavy fees from the film units.

Culture
KM Pattinam was very rich culturally. The different communities celebrate their festivals in a sober way. Festivals means for many new clothes, sight seeing tours and new films. The traditional Harvest festival Pongal has also become more like a family festival like Diwali.
Temples celebrate their yearly festivals. In Mahaliamman temples, people offer fire-works. Filmy music and filmstyle dances dominate the events. The temples have stages for staging plays and dances, but the theatre died due to films. There are no promoters for theatre and traditional dances. Film Music and dance have influenced the traditional music and dance.
Folk songs were once popular in the region, but today it is also extinct.
There are a few movie halls, but due to cable TV, the movie halls are not very often visited by people. The buildings are wearing out.  Two or three halls were already closed. Valliammal was one of the movie halls which is still operating in the village.

Sports
KM Pattinam is famous for Volleyball and Cricket.

There is a very old volleyball club named
Sakthi volleyball club. Some players played for the district and state level teams.  They had a ground for volleyball and cricket, every year cricket tournament is held here in (kottur G.H.S.school ground) which teams from different areas of Coimbatore district participate.

References

Cities and towns in Coimbatore district